Shonku Ekai Aksho (Shonku, All in All)  is a Professor Shonku series book written by Satyajit Ray and published by Ananda Publishers in 1983. Ray wrote the stories about Professor Shanku for Bengali magazines Sandesh and Anandamela. This book is a collection of four Shonku stories.

Stories
 Mahakasher Doot (Anandamela, Autumn 1979),
 Shonku'r Congo Abhijan. (Anandamela, Autumn 198 1),
 Nakurbabu o El Dorado (Anandamela, Autmnn 1980),
 Professor Shonku o UFO (Anandamela, Autumn, 1982)

See also
Punashcha Professor Shonku
Selam Professor Shonku

References

1983 books
Science fiction short stories
Professor Shonku